Jelševnik is a settlement west of the town of Črnomelj in the White Carniola area of southeastern Slovenia. The area is part of the traditional region of Lower Carniola and is now included in the Southeast Slovenia Statistical Region.

Near the settlement, at the source of Dobličica Creek, a tributary of the Lahinja, the unique amphibian black proteus was found in 1986.

References

External links
Jelševnik on Geopedia

Populated places in the Municipality of Črnomelj